Ettersgill is a village in County Durham, England. It is situated at the top of Teesdale, on the north side of the Tees between Newbiggin and Forest-in-Teesdale. The village consists of scattered farms and farmhouses,  centred on the fertile valley created by Etters Gill Beck, which flows from the mooorland into the Tees south of High Force.

References

External links

Villages in County Durham